The Kleiner Landgraben is a small river of Mecklenburg-Vorpommern, Germany. Collecting the water of a wetland and lateral sources, it is drained in both directions, in the south into Tollense River, and to the north into the Großer Landgraben, another affluent of Tollense River. Therefore, Kleiner Landgraben is a pseudobifurcation. The meaning of Kleiner Landgraben is something like "Small Border Canal". For several centuries it was part of the border between Mecklenburg and Pomerania. The Landgraben drains one of the broad glacial valleys of Mecklenburg-Vorpommern. In these valleys, there is no strict discrimination between natural and artificial courses of water.

See also
List of rivers of Mecklenburg-Vorpommern

Rivers of Mecklenburg-Western Pomerania
Rivers of Germany